Artemas is an unincorporated community in Bedford County, Pennsylvania, United States. Artemas has a post office with ZIP code 17211, which opened on June 23, 1892.

References

Unincorporated communities in Bedford County, Pennsylvania
Unincorporated communities in Pennsylvania